The name 'Hamour' or 'Hammour' is used to describe a number of fish, mainly the Goldspotted rockcod (Epinephelus coioides) and Brown spotted reef cod (Epinephelus chlorostigma). At the same time, it is the name given to a variety of closely related fish species in the Persian Gulf.

GCC
The Gulf Cooperation Council keeps fishery records on the fish caught in their territorial waters. Of the estimated 540 species of fish in the Persian Gulf, 11 different species are commonly referred to as Hamour. In records kept by the state of Qatar, there is a clear indication that the amount of "Hamour" being caught is rapidly declining, and has dropped sharply since 2008. The decline of the culturally important and prized hamour fish prompted Qatar to start a program to farm the fish species, focusing on the most highly valued Epinephelus coioides. Yet the same states keep record on a "Hamour Group", roughly relating to the catch-all phrase "Grouper". This includes the Brown spotted reef cod, known in the Persian Gulf states as "Souman", but also as "Hammour".

Iran
The words 'Hamour' and 'Soman' are also used in Iran to describe similar species of fish, for example the Hamour-e Khaldar-e Qahvei, which is the Persian name for the Brown-spotted reef rod, but which is known in Arabic simply as Hamour.

Bibliography

References

Fish common names